Andrea Colombo (born 14 February 1974 in Bollate) is an Italian sprinter who specialized in the 100 metres.

He won nine medals (eight at senior level), at the International athletics competitions, seven of these with national relays team.

Biography
He finished seventh in 4 x 100 metres relay at the 2000 Olympic Games, together with teammates Francesco Scuderi, Alessandro Cavallaro and Maurizio Checcucci. He also won the gold medal in 200 metres at the 1993 European Junior Championships, and at the 2001 Mediterranean Games he won the silver medal in 200 metres and the gold medal in relay. He also competed at the 1999 World Championships in Athletics, in relay, without reaching the final.

His personal best times were 10.23 seconds in the 100 metres, achieved in September 1999 in Rieti; and 20.60 seconds in the 200 metres, achieved at the 2001 Mediterranean Games.

Olympic results

National titles
He has won 1 time the individual national championship.
1 win in the 100 metres (1999)

See also
 Italy national relay team

References

External links
 

1974 births
Living people
People from Bollate
Italian male sprinters
Athletes (track and field) at the 2000 Summer Olympics
Olympic athletes of Italy
Mediterranean Games gold medalists for Italy
Mediterranean Games silver medalists for Italy
Athletes (track and field) at the 2001 Mediterranean Games
Universiade medalists in athletics (track and field)
World Athletics Championships athletes for Italy
Mediterranean Games medalists in athletics
Universiade bronze medalists for Italy
Italian Athletics Championships winners
Medalists at the 1995 Summer Universiade
Medalists at the 1999 Summer Universiade
Medalists at the 2001 Summer Universiade
Sportspeople from the Metropolitan City of Milan